68th Avenue–64th Place Historic District is a national historic district in Ridgewood, Queens, New York.  It includes 46 contributing buildings built between 1909 and 1913.  They consist mainly of two story brick row houses with one apartment per floor.  Buildings feature alternating yellow, amber, brown and burnt orange speckled brick and cast stone detailing in the Romanesque Revival style.

It was listed on the National Register of Historic Places in 1983.

References

Romanesque Revival architecture in New York City
Ridgewood, Queens
Historic districts on the National Register of Historic Places in Queens, New York